This is a list of seasons played by FC Barcelona Femení, the women's section of football club FC Barcelona. It competes in the Spanish League from the Ciutat Esportiva Joan Gamper in Sant Joan Despí, near Barcelona.

From 1988 to 2001 it competed as Club Femení Barcelona.

Summary

References

seasons
 
Barcelona Women
Barcelona
Femenino seasons